John Townshend may refer to:
Sir John Townshend (died 1603) (1560s–1603), MP and soldier, ancestor of the Marquesses Townshend, killed in a duel
Lord John Townshend (1757–1833), British Whig politician, MP for Cambridge University, Westminster and Knaresborough
John Townshend, 4th Marquess Townshend (1798–1863), his son, British naval commander
John Townshend, 5th Marquess Townshend  (1831–1899), his son, British peer and Liberal MP for Tamworth, 1856–1863
John Townshend, 6th Marquess Townshend (1866–1921), his son, British peer
John Townshend, 2nd Viscount Sydney (1764–1831), British peer
John Townshend, 1st Earl Sydney (1805–1890), his son, MP for Whitchurch, 1826–1831, Lord Chamberlain and Lord Steward
 John Townshend (cook), author of The Universal Cook

See also
John Townend (1934–2018), British politician
John Townsend (disambiguation)